Washington Montgomery Bartlett (February 29, 1824 – September 12, 1887) was an American politician who served as the 16th governor of California from January 1887 until his death in September of that year, as well as the 20th mayor of San Francisco from 1883 to 1887. He was the first Jewish governor of any U.S. state and – to date – the only Jewish governor of California. Bartlett converted to Congregationalism upon his death bed and was buried as a Christian.

Biography
Bartlett was born in Savannah, Georgia in 1824, the son of Sarah E. Melhado and Cosam Emir Bartlett. His mother was a Sephardic Jew. Unlike the second elected Jewish governor, Moses Alexander of Idaho, Bartlett was not particularly religious and did not participate in Jewish observances while in California: His funeral was conducted at the Trinity Episcopal Church in San Francisco.

He was a lifelong bachelor and a printer by trade. During his lifetime Bartlett was a San Francisco newspaper publisher, San Francisco County Clerk, lawyer, California State Senate member, mayor, and finally a governor.

Bartlett's term as governor started and ended in 1887 when he died in office of Bright's disease nine months into his term. His inaugural address after being elected as governor was presented on January 8, 1887.

Bartlett is buried in Mountain View Cemetery in Oakland, California.

References

External links 
 Washington Bartlett biography at the California State Library

1824 births
1887 deaths
American publishers (people)
American Sephardic Jews
California lawyers
Democratic Party California state senators
Democratic Party governors of California
Jewish American state governors of the United States
Jewish mayors of places in the United States
Mayors of San Francisco
Politicians from Savannah, Georgia
Burials at Mountain View Cemetery (Oakland, California)
19th-century American politicians
Jewish American people in California politics
19th-century American lawyers
19th-century American businesspeople